Willard Rhodes (1901 – May 15, 1992) was an American ethnomusicologist.  He is known for his extensive recording of American Indian music between 1939 and 1952.

Rhodes grew up in Dunkirk, Ohio and received A.B. and Bachelor of Music degrees from Wittenberg University in Springfield, Ohio. He received an M.A. from Columbia University in 1929.  In France, he studied with Nadia Boulanger. From 1937 to 1969, he served as a professor at Columbia University, where he founded the graduate program in ethnomusicology, and co-founded the Society for Ethnomusicology, serving as that organization's first president.

He also conducted field recording in Zimbabwe, Nigeria, and India. His field recordings have been released by Folkways Records and the Library of Congress Recording Laboratory.

A collection of Rhodes' recordings and other materials is held by the UCLA Ethnomusicology Archive.

A selection of American Indian music, chosen by Rhodes, was released on the Voyager Golden Record (1977).

References
Christensen, Dieter (1992). "Willard Rhodes 1901-1992." Yearbook for Traditional Music, vol. 24, pp. xii-xiii.
Korson, Rae, and Joseph C. Hickerson (1969). "The Willard Rhodes Collection of American Indian Music in the Archive of Folk Song." Ethnomusicology, vol. 13, no. 2 (May 1969), pp. 296–304.
McAllester, David P. (1993). "Obituary: Willard Rhodes (1901-1992)." Ethnomusicology, vol. 37, no. 2 (Spring 1993), pp. 251–262.
Rhodes, Willard (1952). "Acculturation in North American Indian Music." In Acculturation in the Americas: Proceedings and Selected Papers of the 29th International Congress of Americanists, ed. Sol Tax, with an introduction by Melville J. Herskovits, p. 127-132. Chicago: University of Chicago Press.
Rhodes, Willard (1952). "Songs of American Indians Still Live." The New York Times, November 23, 1952, sec. 2, p. 7.

External links
Willard Rhodes page

1901 births
1992 deaths
People from Deshler, Ohio
Ethnomusicologists
Columbia University faculty
Columbia University alumni
Wittenberg University alumni
People from Hardin County, Ohio
20th-century musicologists